In topology, the cartesian product of topological spaces can be given several different topologies. One of the more natural choices is the box topology, where a base is given by the Cartesian products of open sets in the component spaces. Another possibility is the product topology, where a base is given by the Cartesian products of open sets in the component spaces, only finitely many of which can be not equal to the entire component space.

While the box topology has a somewhat more intuitive definition than the product topology, it satisfies fewer desirable properties. In particular, if all the component spaces are compact, the box topology on their Cartesian product will not necessarily be compact, although the product topology on their Cartesian product will always be compact. In general, the box topology is finer than the product topology, although the two agree in the case of finite direct products (or when all but finitely many of the factors are trivial).

Definition
Given  such that

The name box comes from  the case of Rn, in which the basis sets look like boxes. The set  endowed with the box topology is sometimes denoted by

Properties

Box topology on Rω:

 The box topology is completely regular
 The box topology is neither compact nor connected
 The box topology is not first countable (hence not metrizable)
 The box topology is not separable
 The box topology is paracompact (and hence normal and completely regular) if the continuum hypothesis is true

Example — failure of continuity 
The following example is based on the Hilbert cube. Let Rω denote the countable cartesian product of R with itself, i.e. the set of all sequences in R. Equip R with the standard topology and Rω with the box topology. Define:

So all the component functions are the identity and hence continuous, however we will show f is not continuous. To see this, consider the open set 

Suppose f were continuous. Then, since:

there should exist  such that  But this would imply that 

which is false since  for  Thus f is not continuous even though all its component functions are.

Example — failure of compactness 
Consider the countable product  where for each i,  with the discrete topology. The box topology on  will also be the discrete topology. Since discrete spaces are compact if and only if they are finite, we immediately see that  is not compact, even though its component spaces are. 

 is not sequentially compact either: consider the sequence  given by 

Since no two points in the sequence are the same, the sequence has no limit point, and therefore  is not sequentially compact.

Convergence in the box topology
Topologies are often best understood by describing how sequences converge.

Because the box topology is finer than the product topology, convergence of a sequence in the box topology is a more stringent condition.
In other words, the sequence  is eventually constant for nearly all  and in a uniform way.

Comparison with product topology

The basis sets in the product topology have almost the same definition as the above, except with the qualification that all but finitely many Ui are equal to the component space Xi.  The product topology satisfies a very desirable property for maps fi : Y → Xi into the component spaces: the product map  f: Y → X defined by the component functions fi is continuous if and only if all the fi are continuous.  As shown above, this does not always hold in the box topology. This actually makes the box topology very useful for providing counterexamples—many qualities such as compactness, connectedness, metrizability, etc., if possessed by the factor spaces, are not in general preserved in the product with this topology.

See also 

 Cylinder set
 List of topologies

Notes

References
 Steen, Lynn A. and Seebach, J. Arthur Jr.; Counterexamples in Topology, Holt, Rinehart and Winston (1970). .

External links
 

Topological spaces
Operations on structures